Publika TV is a Moldovan broadcast news television station. It was launched on 7 April 2010, their founders being the Romanian businessman Sorin Ovidiu Vîntu and the Moldovan businessman Vladimir Plahotniuc.

It is the second news TV channel from Moldova, after Jurnal TV (later this was transformed into a generalist station), and currently the only news TV station, which produces and broadcasts content in Romanian, Russian.

References

Television channels in Moldova
Television channels and stations established in 2010
24-hour television news channels in Moldova
Television networks in Moldova
Romanian-language television networks in Moldova